Francis William "Bill" Alley (born April 20, 1936) is a retired American javelin thrower. Competing for the Millburn High School, University of Kansas, and Syracuse University he won the NCAA title in 1959–60 and placed second at the AAU Championships in 1961–62. At the 1960 Olympics he finished 23rd.

References

External links
 

1936 births
Living people
American male javelin throwers
Olympic track and field athletes of the United States
Athletes (track and field) at the 1960 Summer Olympics
Track and field athletes from Newark, New Jersey